The Journalist is the magazine of the United Kingdom's National Union of Journalists (NUJ) which is published six times a year. It was started as a newspaper and was relaunched as a magazine in 1993. Since April 2008, the magazine is available online.

References

External links
 

Bi-monthly magazines published in the United Kingdom
Online magazines published in the United Kingdom
Magazines about the media
Magazines established in 1993
Magazines disestablished in 2008
Online magazines with defunct print editions